Aridarum purseglovei is a species of aroid that is endemic to Sarawak in Malaysia. It can be found growing on wet, mossy rocks near rivers, or on river banks.

References

Aroideae
Endemic flora of Borneo
Flora of Sarawak